George Henderson may refer to:

Academia and science
George Henderson (architect) (1846–1905), Scottish architect
George Washington Henderson (1850-1936), American academic
George Gerald Henderson (1862–1942), chemist and professor
George Henderson (scholar) (1866–1912), Gaelic scholar
George Cockburn Henderson (1870–1944), Australian academic in the Universities of Sydney and Adelaide
George D. S. Henderson (born 1931), art historian, author, and Emeritus Professor of Medieval Art at the University of Cambridge
George Robin Henderson (1941–2016), Scottish mathematician

Arts and entertainment
George Wylie Henderson (1904–1965), American author of the Harlem Renaissance
George Henderson (cartoonist) (1911–1985), New Zealand cartoonist

Military
George Francis Robert Henderson (1854–1903), British soldier and military author
George R. Henderson (1893–1964), World War II-era officer in United States Navy
George Stuart Henderson (1893–1920), recipient of the Victoria Cross
George Henderson (GC), British recipient of the George Cross

Politics
George Henderson (Australian politician) (1857–1933), Australian politician
George Henderson (Manitoba politician) (1916–2008), former MLA in Manitoba
George Henderson (Northern Ireland politician), former Member of the Northern Ireland Parliament for Antrim 
George Henderson (Prince Edward Island politician) (1935–2020), former Member of Parliament in Canada

Sports
George Henderson (footballer, born 1873), Scottish footballer
George Henderson (footballer, born 1880) (1880–1930), Scottish footballer
George Henderson (footballer, born 1902) (1902–1975), Scottish footballer for Sunderland
Geordie Henderson (1897–1953), Scottish footballer
Krazy George Henderson (born 1944), American cheerleader
Rube Henderson (George E. Henderson, 1894–1978), American baseball player

Religion
George Henderson (bishop) (1922–1997), Episcopal bishop and Primus in Scotland
G. D. Henderson (1888–1957), Scottish historian and minister of the Church of Scotland

Fictional characters
George Henderson, in the 1987 film Harry and the Hendersons
George Henderson (River City), Scottish soap opera character

Other uses
George R. Henderson Medal, given by the Franklin Institute for improvements to railway engineering